Los Cuervos están de luto (English: The crows are in mourning) is a 1965 Mexican comedy film directed by Francisco del Villar and starring Silvia Pinal and Lilia Prado. The film is based on the play of the same name by Mexican author Hugo Arguelles.

This film was shot at Estudios Churubusco.

Plot
Don Lacho (José Luis Jiménez), a greedy old man, is about to die. His three children, but mainly his daughter-in-law Piedad (Silvia Pinal), are anxiously awaiting his death to collect the inheritance, but the old man refuses to die.

In his hallucinations, the old man sees the ghost of his dead wife (Kitty de Hoyos), who reveals that one of his three children is not his child. The man takes his last moments to torment all in doubt.

Things get complicated on the arrival of his third child with his wife (Lilia Prado) and by the indiscretions of the townspeople.

Cast
 Silvia Pinal as Piedad
 Kitty de Hoyos as a Wife's ghost
 Lilia Prado as Mariana
 Narciso Busquets as Mateo
 José Luis Jiménez as don Lacho
 José Gálvez as Gelasio
 Enrique Álvarez Félix as Enrique
 Fanny Schiller
 Ada Carrasco
Manuel Zozaya
 Dalia Íñiguez

External links

1965 films
Mexican black-and-white films
1965 comedy films
Mexican films based on plays
1960s Mexican films